Bruzzi is a surname. Notable people with the surname include:

Fabiano Bruzzi, Brazilian Paralympic footballer
Stefano Bruzzi (1835–1911), Italian painter
Stella Bruzzi (born 1962), Italian-born British scholar of film and media studies

See also
Bruzz
Bruzzese
Buzzi